Sarva pindi is a savory, circular-shaped pancake made from rice flour and peanuts in Telangana, India. In the Warangal district, the item is known as "tappala chekka", while in Siddipet it is also known as "sarva pindi". "Ganju" means utensil or a round shaped bowl and "pindi" means flour in Telugu language. So, the phrase "Ganju Pindi" can be described as rice flour that is made like atta flour and stick to the round shaped pan. In Warangal, the dish is known as "ginnappa". The village Bollepally in Warangal district is particularly famous for ginnappa (sarva pindi), as the story about ginnappa first originated from the Challa Anasurya house in the village. Years ago, Anasurya was feeling very hungry in rainy season, but desired a new dish with less oil. As she had only rice flour in her home at the time, this led to the creation of the sarva pindi snack. She began to sell some in Bollepally village, Telangana district. Eventually the snack became popular throughout Telangana.

Ingredients
Sarva pindi is essentially made of rice flour, channa dal (lentil), peanuts and spices, making it a delicious and healthy dish.

Etymology
The word Sarva Pindi comes from a combination of two terms: "sarva", meaning a deep pot or pan; and "appa", meaning a cake-sort of preparation. Therefore, the direct translation of Sarva pindi is the "pan cake". The Sarva Pindi pancake is one of the ethnic dishes from the Telangana cuisine.

Grade
It is recognized as one of the Telangana Traditional cuisines.

References

External links
 

Telangana cuisine
Indian snack foods